Desmodesmus is a genus of green algae in the family Scenedesmaceae.  It is the only chlorophyll-containing organism known to have caused human infections in immunocompetent individuals.  All known cases involved open injuries occurring in fresh water.

References

External links

Sphaeropleales genera
Sphaeropleales